Michael Vincent Keuler (born July 25, 1978) is an American former ski jumper who competed in the 1998 Winter Olympics. He was born in Minneapolis, Minnesota.

References

1978 births
Living people
American male ski jumpers
Olympic ski jumpers of the United States
Ski jumpers at the 1998 Winter Olympics
Skiers from Minneapolis